John Kearns may refer to:

John Kearns (politician) (1784–1864), Irish-Canadian politician
John Kearns (footballer) (1883–1928), English footballer
Jack Kearns (footballer) (1914–1945), English footballer
John Kearns (disc jockey) (born c. 1967), English disc jockey, radio and TV presenter, see Young Star Search
John Kearns (comedian) (born 1987), English comedian

See also
John Kerans, politician and Royal Navy officer